Lete has been led by a kgôsikgolo, or a paramount chief, since its establishment in 1780. Mosadi Seboko has been the kgôsikgolo of Lete since 2002.

List of Rulers of  Balete (baMalete)

Territory located in present-day Botswana.

Kgôsikgolo = Paramount Chief

Sources
http://www.rulers.org/botstrad.html

See also
Botswana
Heads of state of Botswana
Heads of government of Botswana
Colonial heads of Botswana (Bechuanaland)
Rulers of baKgatla
Rulers of baKwêna
Rulers of baNgwaketse
Rulers of Bangwato (bamaNgwato)
Rulers of baRôlông
Rulers of baTawana
Rulers of baTlôkwa
Lists of office-holders

Botswana chiefs